Matthew George Whitaker (born October 29, 1969) is an American lawyer, lobbyist and politician who served as the acting United States Attorney General from November 7, 2018, to February 14, 2019. He was appointed to that position by President Donald Trump after Jeff Sessions resigned at Trump's request. Whitaker had previously served as Chief of Staff to Sessions from October 2017 to November 2018.

While attending the University of Iowa, Whitaker played tight end for the University of Iowa Hawkeyes football team, including in the 1991 Rose Bowl.

In 2002, Whitaker was the candidate of the Republican Party for Treasurer of Iowa. From 2004 to 2009, he served as the United States Attorney for the Southern District of Iowa, where he was known for aggressively prosecuting drug traffickers. Whitaker ran in the 2014 Iowa Republican primary for the United States Senate. He later wrote opinion pieces and appeared on talk-radio shows and cable news as the executive director of the Foundation for Accountability and Civic Trust (FACT), a conservative advocacy group.

On December 7, 2018, Trump nominated William Barr for Attorney General. The legality of Whitaker's appointment as acting U.S. Attorney General was challenged in multiple lawsuits, and questioned by legal scholars, commentators, and politicians. On February 15, 2019, after Barr was sworn in on the previous day, Whitaker became a senior counselor in the Office of the Associate Attorney General; he resigned from the Justice Department on March 2, 2019. After leaving the Justice Department, Whitaker became a guest on news and analysis shows including as a CNN contributor, and was affiliated with the law firm of Graves Garrett. In August 2019, he became a managing director at Axiom Strategies and Clout Public Affairs.

Early life, education, and college football career 
Matthew George Whitaker was born in Des Moines, Iowa, on October 29, 1969. He graduated from Ankeny High School, where he was a football star. He was inducted into the Iowa High School Football Hall of Fame in 2009. Whitaker attended the University of Iowa, receiving a bachelor's degree in communications in 1991 and Master of Business Administration and Juris Doctor degrees in 1995.

As an undergraduate between 1990 and 1992, Whitaker was the backup tight end for the University of Iowa Hawkeyes football team under coach Hayden Fry, including the 1991 Rose Bowl the Hawkeyes lost to the Washington Huskies. Whitaker played in 33 games, including two bowl games, and made 21 receptions for a total of 203 yards, scoring two touchdowns. In 1993, he received the Big Ten Medal of Honor for proficiency in scholarship and athletics awarded each year to one male and one female student-athlete at each Big Ten Conference school. Whitaker graduated from college in three-and-a-half years, and played his last season of football while attending law school.

Throughout his career, Whitaker had stated that he was an Academic All-American in college. A December 2018 investigation by The Wall Street Journal found that he was not. He was sponsor GTE's 1992 GTE District VII Academic All-District selection; an Iowa football guide erroneously referred to the honor as GTE District VII Academic All-American. A spokeswoman for College Sports Information Directors of America (CoSIDA) said CoSIDA was less formally organized in the 1990s and "We know that people over time use terms interchangeably and innocently."

Career 
After graduating from law school, Whitaker lived in Minneapolis, Minnesota from 1995 to 2001, before moving back to Iowa.

Private practice and business and political activities (1995–2004)
Whitaker worked for a number of regional law firms, including Briggs & Morgan (Minneapolis) and Finley Alt Smith (Des Moines), and he was corporate counsel for national grocery store chain SuperValu in Minneapolis. He also owned or co-owned a trailer manufacturing company from 2002 to 2005 and a day-care center from 2003 to 2015. In 2003, Whitaker and a partner co-founded Buy the Yard Concrete, based at Whitaker's home in Urbandale, Iowa. In 2005, the company and Whitaker were sued in Nevada for $12,000 in unpaid rental fees for supplies and equipment related to a concrete project in Las Vegas. The lawsuit was settled out of court.

Whitaker ran as a Republican for Treasurer of Iowa in 2002, losing to incumbent Democrat Michael Fitzgerald by 55% to 43%.

United States Attorney 

Iowa Senator Chuck Grassley recommended Whitaker as one of three attorneys suggested to President George W. Bush for the position of United States Attorney for the Southern District of Iowa.  In February 2004, Bush nominated Whitaker to the position,  despite assertions that Whitaker lacked relevant legal experience. Senate Democrats objecting to Bush nominees held up the nomination for four months before Whitaker was confirmed on June 15, 2004.

In his first year in office, Whitaker issued a record 500 indictments, more than half of which were drug prosecutions, mainly related to trafficking of methamphetamine. In July 2005, Whitaker joined neighboring U.S. Attorneys Michael Heavican and Charles Larson Sr. in issuing a warning that persons crossing state lines to obtain pseudoephedrine, a methamphetamine ingredient, could be prosecuted in federal court. As U.S. Attorney, Whitaker sought stringent sentences for individuals charged with drug crimes. One case involved a woman who had two prior nonviolent drug convictions and was informed by Whitaker's office that, as a third-time offender, her sentence could be enhanced to a mandatory life sentence unless she agreed to a plea deal of 21 to 27 years in prison. She agreed to the plea bargain. Federal District Court Judge Robert W. Pratt said in 2016 that the prosecutors in the case had misused their authority, forcing him to impose a sentence "disproportionate to her crime," and urged President Obama to grant clemency. Obama commuted her sentence after she had served 11 years in prison.

Whitaker also served on a regional anti-terrorism task force, which examined both international and domestic threats, and focused on prosecuting child pornography and violent crimes against children. From 2005 to 2007, Whitaker's office, together with the FBI, investigated and unsuccessfully prosecuted Iowa State Senator Matt McCoy on charges of attempting to extort $2,000. A columnist for The Des Moines Register said that the case was based on "the word of a man former associates depicted as a drug user, a deadbeat and an abuser of women; a man so shady even his Alcoholics Anonymous sponsors called him 'a pathological liar.'" The jury reached a verdict of not guilty within two hours. In 2007, Whitaker also led the investigation of four executives of the Central Iowa Employment and Training Consortium (CIETC), a Des Moines-based job training agency, who were accused of collectively stealing more than $2 million from the agency over a three-year period. The alleged ringleader, CIETC CEO Ramona Cunningham, pleaded guilty on June 30, 2008.

Whitaker resigned in November 2009 following the Senate confirmation of his replacement, Nicholas A. Klinefeldt, who was nominated by President Obama.

Private practice and business and political activities (2009–2017)
From 2009 to 2017, Whitaker was a managing partner of the small general practice law firm Whitaker Hagenow & Gustoff LLP (later Hagenow & Gustoff LLP) in Des Moines.

In 2011, Whitaker applied for an appointment to the Iowa Supreme Court but was not among the finalists whose names were submitted to the governor for selection for one of the three open seats.

In 2011, he co-founded Whitaker Strategy Group, a lobbying and consulting firm.

In 2012, Whitaker and two partners invested, under a venture named MEM Investment, in the purchase and development of an affordable-housing apartment building in Des Moines. In 2014, Whitaker's partners left this partnership, and by spring of 2016, the company was unable to complete the renovations on time, and the city terminated the loan agreement. The building was then sold and completed by another contractor.

Whitaker was a candidate for the Republican nomination in the 2014 United States Senate election in Iowa. He came in fourth in the Republican primary, with 11,909 votes (7.54%). Whitaker then chaired the campaign of Sam Clovis, another unsuccessful primary candidate who had been selected to run for Iowa State Treasurer. Clovis lost in the November 2014 general election.

World Patent Marketing

From 2014 to 2017, Whitaker served on the advisory board of World Patent Marketing (WPM), a Florida-based company billed as an invention promotion firm. According to an FBI investigation, the advisory board members never met. In a 2014 statement Whitaker publicly vouched for WPM, claiming they went "beyond making statements about doing business 'ethically' and translate[d] those words into action". The company contributed to Whitaker's 2014 U.S. Senate campaign, and over the three-year period from 2014 and 2017 paid Whitaker less than $17,000 for work performed. Some customers accused the company of using Whitaker's background as a U.S. Attorney to threaten them. In one 2015 email mentioning his background as a former federal prosecutor, Whitaker told a customer that filing a complaint with the Better Business Bureau or "smearing" the company online could result in "serious civil and criminal consequences". The owner of Ripoff Report told The Wall Street Journal that Whitaker had called him in 2015 demanding his website take down negative reports about WPM, alleging, "He threatened to ruin my business if I didn't remove the reports. He [said he] would have the government shut me down under some homeland security law".

The company was later determined to have engaged in deceptive practices. In 2017, FTC investigators examined whether Whitaker had played any role in making threats of legal action to silence the company's critics. Whitaker rebuffed an FTC subpoena for records in October 2017, shortly after he had joined the Department of Justice. After Whitaker's appointment in the Department of Justice in September 2017, White House and senior Justice Department officials were reportedly surprised to learn of Whitaker's connection to the company. A spokesperson for Whitaker said that he was not aware of the company's fraud, and the court receiver in the case, Jonathan Perlman, stated he had "no reason to believe that [Whitaker] knew of any of the wrongdoing."

Foundation for Accountability and Civic Trust 
From October 2014 to September 2017, Whitaker was the executive director of the Foundation for Accountability and Civic Trust (FACT); he was the organization's only full-time employee in 2015 and 2016. FACT, founded in late 2014, is a conservative nonprofit organization specializing in legal and ethical issues related to politics. The group was backed by $1 million in seed money from conservative donors, whom Whitaker declined to identify to the media. According to the organization's first tax return, its funding — $600,000 in 2014 — came from a conservative donor-advised fund called Donors Trust, a pass-through vehicle that allows donors to remain anonymous. From its creation in 2014 through 2018, FACT reported contributions of $3.5 million on its tax filings; as a 501(c)(3) organization, it did not disclose its donors. The group's largest single expense was Whitaker's salary; Whitaker collected $1.2 million from the group over four years, making it the overwhelming source of his income from 2016 onward.

While Whitaker was the head of FACT, the organization had a special focus on the Hillary Clinton email controversy and perceived favoritism in the business dealings of Clinton. Despite claiming to be nonpartisan, the organization called for ethics investigations into or filed complaints for more than 40 different Democratic politicians, officials, and organizations, compared to only a few Republicans. FACT was characterized by CNN reporter Drew Griffin as using "the legal system as a political weapon", and it was reported that an unnamed source described as a "GOP operative" had characterized the organization as a "chop shop of fake ethics complaints". During his time at FACT, Whitaker wrote opinion pieces that appeared in USA Today and the Washington Examiner, and he appeared regularly on conservative talk-radio shows and cable news.

CNN contributor 
For four months, from June to September 2017, Whitaker was a CNN contributor. One month prior to joining the Justice Department, he wrote an opinion column for CNN titled "Mueller's Investigation of Trump is Going Too Far". He retweeted a link to an article that stated that Mueller's investigation was a "lynch mob", that it should be limited, and that it should not probe into Trump's finances.

Trump administration

Department of Justice Chief of Staff 
On September 22, 2017, a Justice Department official announced that Sessions was appointing Whitaker to replace Jody Hunt as his chief of staff. George J. Terwilliger III, a former U.S. attorney and deputy attorney general, said in his role as chief of staff, Whitaker would have dealt daily with making "substantive choices about what is important to bring to the AG". As Chief of Staff, Whitaker discussed with and transmitted to U.S. Attorney for Utah John W. Huber a letter from Sessions regarding investigating former Secretary of State Hillary Clinton at Trump's request. While the Justice Department denied the letter existed in response to a FOIA request filed by watchdog group American Oversight, it later retracted the denial and made public an email from Whitaker to Huber about the investigation and attaching Sessions' letter.

Acting Attorney General 
With the resignation of Sessions on November 7, 2018, Whitaker was appointed to serve as Acting Attorney General under the Federal Vacancies Reform Act of 1998. In that position, he directly supervised Robert Mueller's Special Counsel investigation, which had previously been supervised by Deputy Attorney General Rod Rosenstein in his role as Acting Attorney General, due to the recusal of Attorney General Jeff Sessions.

In January 2019, Whitaker along with Homeland Security Secretary Kirstjen Nielsen, Secretary of Commerce Wilbur Ross, and FBI Director Christopher A. Wray announced 23 criminal charges against Chinese technology giant Huawei and its CFO Meng Wanzhou, including financial fraud, money laundering, conspiracy to defraud the United States, theft of trade secret technology, providing bonuses to workers who stole confidential information from companies around the world, wire fraud, obstruction of justice and sanctions violations. In late 2018, he rejected a request from U.S. Attorney Geoffrey Berman to file criminal charges against Halkbank, the largest state-owned bank in Turkey, for an alleged multi-billion-dollar scheme to evade U.S. sanctions on Iran. On December 18, 2018, Whitaker signed the regulation that reclassified bump stocks as machine guns, rendering them illegal to possess under federal law. The four members of Trump's Federal Commission on School Safety were appointed in the wake of the Marjory Stoneman Douglas High School massacre, with Whitaker replacing Sessions in November 2018. The commission's report issued in December 2018, called for improved mental health services, recommended that school systems consider arming teachers and other personnel; and advised against increasing the minimum age required for firearm purchases. One of the more controversial elements of the commission's report was a call to rescind a 2014 Education Department guidance document meant to reduce racial disparities in school discipline, and a criticism of the legal concept of disparate impact. The report called for improvements to mental health services, but did not propose federal funding or policy changes to deal with gaps in the mental health care system. The report did not recommend tighter laws to restrict access to guns, prompting criticism from the National Association of Secondary School Principals.

Whitaker also initiated implementation of the First Step Act.

Supervision of the Special Counsel investigation 
In 2017, Whitaker had repeatedly criticized the Mueller investigation on television and on social media and stated that there was no collusion between Russia and the Trump campaign.  Justice Department ethics officials advised Whitaker that there was no financial, personal, or political conflict that would require him to recuse himself from supervision of the Russia investigation. They also said that it was a "close call" and his decision, but in their opinion he "should recuse himself because 'a reasonable person with knowledge of the relevant facts' would question his impartiality due to the statements he had made to the press." Whitaker decided not to recuse himself, not wanting to be the first attorney general "who had recused [himself] based on statements in the news media."

Democrats poised to assume chairmanships of key House committees in January 2019 warned the Justice Department and other departments to preserve records relating to the Mueller investigation and Sessions' firing. Republicans Senator Susan Collins, Senator Jeff Flake, and Senator-elect Mitt Romney, also issued statements insisting that Mueller's investigation must remain free from interference. In February 2019, Whitaker testified before Congress that he had not interfered in any way in the special counsel investigation, and in July 2019, Special Counsel Robert Mueller confirmed in his own testimony before Congress that there was no interference with the investigation.

Legality and constitutionality of the appointment 
In a 2018 opinion, the U.S. Department of Justice's Office of Legal Counsel (OLC) said that the appointment was constitutional due to its temporary nature. The OLC noted that an assistant attorney general who was not confirmed by the Senate had been appointed as acting Attorney General in 1866, and that other individuals not confirmed by the Senate had served as principal officers in an acting capacity more than 160 times between 1809 and 1860, and at least nine times during the Trump, Obama, and Bush administrations.

A number of prominent legal experts, scholars, and former prosecutors and Department of Justice officials offered varying opinions over the legality and constitutionality of Whitaker's appointment. Stephen Vladeck, a law professor at University of Texas, argued that the appointment was permissible under the Federal Vacancies Reform Act of 1998 and the U.S. Supreme Court decision in the 1898 case of United States v. Eaton, because it was temporary and because Sessions formally resigned. Lawyers Neal Katyal and George T. Conway III argued in a New York Times op-ed that the appointment was unconstitutional under the Appointments Clause, as the position of Attorney General is a "principal" one requiring Senate confirmation. Law professor John Yoo from Berkeley, who served as a deputy assistant attorney general in the Office of Legal Counsel in the George W. Bush administration, argued that the Appointments Clause renders the Federal Vacancies Reform Act unconstitutional and that Whitaker's appointment was in violation of that clause. John E. Bies, who served as a deputy assistant attorney general in the OLC in the Obama Administration, wrote that the legality and constitutionality of Whitaker's appointment was an open question. Bies also pointed out that it was a difficult argument to make that Sessions was fired instead of resigning since a court would probably not "look past an official's formal statement that they resigned".

Legal challenges 
There were at least nine unsuccessful legal challenges to Whitaker's appointment. Maryland Attorney General Brian Frosh, representing the State of Maryland, filed for an injunction against Whitaker's appointment. Maryland had previously filed a suit against then-Attorney General Jeff Sessions regarding his inability to defend the Affordable Care Act in court as part of a broader hostility against the Obama-era law from the Trump administration. Maryland was expected to test the argument in court that Whitaker was unlawfully named acting Attorney General, and thus had no standing in the court or authority to respond to their lawsuit. Maryland argued that Whitaker's appointment violated the Constitution, which requires that principal officers of the United States be appointed "with the Advice and Consent of the Senate". Because Whitaker was not serving in a Senate-confirmed position when he was appointed, the state argued that the role of acting Attorney General rightfully belonged to Deputy Attorney General Rod J. Rosenstein. Judge Ellen Lipton Hollander dismissed the case in February 2019. Two other federal district courts issued rulings holding that Whitaker had been properly appointed to the position.

Three Democratic senators — Richard Blumenthal, Sheldon Whitehouse, and Mazie Hirono — filed suit on November 18, 2018, in the D.C. District Court, saying the President violated the Constitution and denied the Senate its right to approve the nomination. Lawyers for Doug Haning, a former agricultural products executive, filed a motion on November 13, 2018, asking a federal court in St. Louis to rule that Whitaker's appointment as acting Attorney General was illegal and thus he had no standing to hear the case. South Texas College of Law professor Josh Blackman predicted a flood of similar motions. Attorney Tom Goldstein filed a motion with the U.S. Supreme Court on November 16, 2018 on behalf of a Nevada resident, asking the court to decide whether Rod Rosenstein was the statutory and constitutional successor to Sessions in a pending lawsuit, rather than Whitaker. The U.S. Supreme Court denied the motion on January 14, 2019.

Legal and policy views

Constitutional issues 
Whitaker stated in a question-and-answer session during his 2014 Iowa Senatorial campaign that "the courts are supposed to be the inferior branch". Whitaker was critical of the U.S. Supreme Court's decision in Marbury v. Madison (1803), the decision that allows judicial review of the constitutionality of the acts of the other branches of government, and several other Supreme Court holdings. When Whitaker later became acting Attorney General four years later, Harvard Law School professor Laurence Tribe commented on Whitaker's views that "the overall picture he presents would have virtually no scholarly support", and that they would be "'destabilizing' to society if he used the power of the attorney general to advance them".

Whitaker also stated during his 2014 Senate bid that he would not support "secular" judges and that judges should "have a biblical view of justice". Asked if he meant Levitical or New Testament justice, he replied "I'm a New Testament". Although Whitaker never specifically commented on the ability of non-Christian judges to serve, Whitaker's answer was subsequently interpreted by various individuals and groups, including the Anti-Defamation League, to imply that he would disqualify non-Christian judges, and were condemned as unconstitutional. An ADL spokesperson said, "The notion that non-Christian judges are disqualified from service is patently wrong, and completely inconsistent with the U.S. Constitution, which explicitly bars any religious test for public office".

Whitaker stated in 2013 he supports the right of states to nullify federal laws.  Stephen Vladeck of University of Texas stated that Whitaker's views on nullification are "irreconcilable not only with the structure of the Constitution, but with its text, especially the text of the Supremacy Clause", and added that "For someone who holds those views to be the nation's chief law enforcement officer, even temporarily, is more than a little terrifying".

Criticisms of 2017 Special Counsel investigation 
During the months prior to joining the Justice Department as Jeff Sessions' chief of staff in September 2017, Whitaker made several statements critical of the Mueller investigation, of which he assumed oversight responsibility upon being appointed Acting Attorney General in November 2018. By July 2017, the Trump White House was interviewing Whitaker to join the Trump legal team. During a six-month span in 2017, Whitaker insisted that there was no obstruction of justice or collusion and criticized the initial appointment of the special counsel. He also called the probe "political" and "the left is trying to sow this theory that essentially Russians interfered with the U.S. election, which has been proven false". He also published an op-ed titled, "Mueller's Investigation of Trump Is Going Too Far" in which he expressed skepticism about the investigation generally and called the appointment of Mueller "ridiculous". He also retweeted a link to an article that referred to the investigation as a "lynch mob".

Relationship with Donald Trump 
Trump saw Whitaker's supportive commentaries on CNN in the summer of 2017, and in July White House counsel Don McGahn interviewed Whitaker to join Trump's legal team as an "attack dog" against Robert Mueller, who was heading the Special Counsel investigation. Trump associates believe Whitaker was later hired to limit the fallout of the investigation, including by reining in any Mueller report and preventing Trump from being subpoenaed. On November 13, a DOJ spokesperson said that Whitaker would seek advice from ethics officials at the Department of Justice (DOJ) about whether a recusal from overseeing the Russia investigation was warranted.

In 2017, Vox writer Murray Waas, reported that an unnamed administration source claimed that Whitaker provided private advice to Trump on how the White House might pressure the Justice Department "to name a special counsel to investigate not only allegations of FBI wrongdoing but also Hillary Clinton". Leonard Leo of the Federalist Society recommended Whitaker to McGahn as chief of staff for Sessions, and Whitaker was installed into that role at the direction of the White House. An anonymous source claimed that Whitaker wanted to replace Sessions, without the latter's knowledge. By early September 2018, Whitaker was on the short list of President Trump's White House staff as the replacement for Don McGahn as the White House Counsel. In September 2018, White House Chief of Staff John F. Kelly referred to Whitaker as the White House's "eyes and ears" in the Justice Department, which the president considered himself at war with.

Trump had spoken with Whitaker in September 2018 about potentially assuming Sessions's role as Attorney General, although it was not clear whether Whitaker would take over on an interim basis or be nominated in a more permanent capacity. At that time, The New York Times described Whitaker as a Trump loyalist who had frequently visited the Oval Office and as having "an easy chemistry" with Trump. Whitaker was referenced by White House staff after a New York Times article disclosed in September that Rod Rosenstein had discussed secretly taping his conversations with the president and talked about using the Twenty-fifth Amendment to remove Trump from office. Trump repeatedly stated on November 9, "I don't know Matt Whitaker", contradicting remarks a month prior on Fox & Friends when he said, "I can tell you Matt Whitaker's a great guy. I mean, I know Matt Whitaker".

In October 2019, after leaving the White House, Whitaker defended Trump amid the impeachment investigation into his conduct as president. Whitaker said there was no evidence of a crime by the President, and that "abuse of power is not a crime" in the Constitution.

Other policy issues 
Whitaker's website previously stated that he was a "Christian who regularly attends church with his family, Matt has built a life on hard work and free enterprise"; and he stated in 2014 that "life begins at conception". In 2014, he advocated for reducing the influence of the government saying, "I know that the government forcing people to violate their faith must never be tolerated. In the Senate, I will be a steadfast protector of every American's religious rights". Whitaker claimed he was not a "climate change denier" but said that the evidence is "inconclusive" and indicated he did not support regulations on carbon emissions.

He has expressed a desire to get rid of family reunification and is against amnesty for illegal immigrants. In 2014, Whitaker represented a blogger who was fired from his job for describing homosexuality as "sinful." He argued the blogger had engaged in a legitimate expression of religious beliefs that should be considered protected speech, saying, "I just really think this case is a prime example of where religious freedom in our country is under assault and we need to send a strong message". Whitaker supported repealing the Affordable Care Act in his 2014 Senate campaign.

Electoral history

2002 Iowa State Treasurer

2014 U.S. Senator for Iowa

Writings

See also 
Timeline of investigations into Trump and Russia (July–December 2018)

References

External links 

Department of Justice profile
Archived official campaign site Matthew Whitaker for Treasurer (2002) and U.S. Senate (2014)

|-

1969 births
Iowa Hawkeyes football players
Iowa lawyers
Iowa Republicans
Living people
People from Ankeny, Iowa
Political chiefs of staff
Politicians from Des Moines, Iowa
Trump administration cabinet members
United States Attorneys for the Southern District of Iowa
United States Attorneys General
University of Iowa College of Law alumni